Mary Phillips may refer to:

 Mary Walker Phillips (1923–2007), American artist, author and teacher
 Mary Elizabeth Phillips (born 1969), United States District Judge
 Mary Elizabeth Phillips (physician) (1875–1956), first woman from Cardiff University to qualify as a medical doctor
 Mary Louise Phillips, neuropsychiatry researcher at the University of Pittsburgh
 Mary Phillips (suffragette) (1880–1969), English suffragette, feminist and socialist
 Mary G. Phillips (1903–1980), superintendent of the United States Army Nurse Corps
 Mary Catherine Phillips, American consumer advocate

See also
 Mary Philips (1901–1975), American stage and film actress